Dashtak-e Sofla or Dashtak Sofla or Dashtok-e Sofla may refer to:
 Dashtak-e Sofla, North Khorasan
 Dashtok-e Sofla, Yazd